The Newcassel Worthies  is a famous Geordie folk song written in the 19th century by William "Willie" Armstrong, in a style deriving from music hall.

Lyrics

Places mentioned 
 Newcassel is Newcastle upon Tyne
 Tyne is the River Tyne
 Lunnen is London

People mentioned 
 John Scott, served twice as Lord Chancellor of Great Britain, son of William
 William Scott of Sandgate, father of John
 Thomas "Tom" Ranson – an engraver (name spelt incorrectly as “Ransom”
 William "Bill" Harvey, another engraver
 Jem Burns and Jem Wallace were local boxing champions
 Blind Willie, is William Purvis.
 A famous Newcastle oil painting Hell's Kitchen by Henry Perlee Parker, painted around 1817 shows numerous of the eccentric characters supposedly living in the area at the time. Unfortunately the painting is now lost, but an engraving taken from it by George Armstrong and a print of this (published by E. Charnley, a bookseller in the Bigg Market) in c1820. Fortunately an index was provided and this list (in alphabetical order) is:
Aud (or Awd) Judy, Blind Willie, Bold Archy (or Airchy), Bugle-Nosed Jack, Captain Starkey, Cull (or Cully) Billy, Donald, Doodem Daddum (with his Dog, Timour, added), Hangy (or Hangie), Jacky Coxon, Jenny Ballo, Pussy Willy, Shoe-tie Anty and Whin Bob – all of whom were often the subjects of songs and songwriters.

Comments on variations to the above version 

In the early 19th century, as today, there were cheap books and magazines.  Many of these "chapbooks" were on poor quality paper to a poor standard and with poor quality print. The works were copied with no thoughts of copyright, and the work required very little proof-reading, and what was done was not required to a high standard. Consequently, the dialect words of songs varied between editions. Some of the differences are interpretation of the dialect, some down to simple mistakes.  Some of the most common are listed below:

Verse 3 Line 1 – "fine" replaced with "fair Lunnen toon"
Verse 5 Line 2 – "bold Airchy" had been written erroneously as "both Airchy"
Verse 6 Line 2 – The name "Jack Coxon" spelt as "Cockson"
Verse 7 Line 1 – The name "Bob Cruddace" spelt as "Cruddance"
Verse 7 Line 2 – "kepping" replaced with "keeping beer"
Verse 9 Line 3 – Changed from "hear it's ony fit" to "maintain that it was fit"
Verse 9 Line 4 – "That's she's rul'd the market" replaced with "he should rule the market"

See also
Geordie dialect words

References 

Newcassel Worthies
Songs related to Newcastle upon Tyne
Newcassel Worthies
Newcassel Worthies
Year of song unknown